The Ghost Behind The Wall is a supernatural fiction novel for young adults by the British author Melvin Burgess, published by Andersen Press in 2000. Set in London, it features a boy who pretends to be a ghost in the ventilation system of his home apartment building and discovers a real ghost.

Burgess and The Ghost were a commended runner up for the annual Carnegie Medal from the Library Association, recognising the year's best children's book by a British subject.

Henry Holt published the first U.S. edition in 2003.

WorldCat libraries report Korean and Italian-language editions.

Notes

References

External links
 —immediately, first edition  
  —immediately, first US edition 
 

British children's novels
Ghost novels
Novels by Melvin Burgess
Novels set in London
2000 British novels
2000 children's books
Andersen Press books